The Ministry of the Colonies was the ministry of the government of the Kingdom of Italy responsible for the governing of the country's colonial possessions and the direction of their economies. It was set up on 20 November 1912 by Royal Decree n. 1205, turning the Central Direction of Colonial Affairs within the Ministry for Foreign Affairs into a separate ministry. Royal Decree n. 431 of 8 April 1937 renamed it the Ministry of Italian Africa after the Second Italo-Ethiopian War, which resulted in the Italian annexation of the Ethiopian Empire and the birth of Italian East Africa. It was suppressed on 19 April 1953 by law n. 430.

List of Ministers

References

Colonies
1912 establishments in Italy
1953 disestablishments in Italy
Ministries established in 1912
Ministries disestablished in 1953
Italy